Kaduna Polytechnic is one of the earliest polytechnics in Nigeria, located at Tudun Wada   area of Kaduna South local government of Kaduna state, North-Western Nigeria. It was established in 1956 as Kaduna Technical Institute after the British Government accepted the upgrading of Yaba Higher College (now Yaba College of Technology) to a technical institute and also proposed the establishment of technical institutes in Kaduna and Enugu through the recommendation of the Higher Education Commission. The polytechnic offers National Diploma and Higher National Diploma courses at the undergraduate level. In 2019/2020 academic session the institute will start awarding National Diploma in Railway Engineering Technology as approved by NBTE on 30 January 2020. The board of Governors of Kaduna Polytechnic was set up in 1991, with representative of eleven state governments, universities, rectors. the board is responsible for the supervision and control of the school. they are called the Governing Council.

Isa Kaita Library 
The Polytechnic library is known as Isa Kaita  Library is equipped with information resources for the support of research, learning of both students and staff. it is located at the main campus in  tudun wada Kaduna.

Colleges
 College of Business & Management Studies (CBMS)
 College of Environmental Studies (CES)
 College of Engineering (COE)
 College of Science and Technology (CST)
 College of Administrative Studies and Social Sciences (CASSS)
College of Technical and Vocational Education (CTVE)

Notable alumni 

Frederick Leonard, Nigerian actor.
Saleh Mamman, Nigerian minister of power
Panam Percy Paul, Nigerian Gospel Singer
Rahama Sadau, Nigerian Actress
Shehu Sani, Nigerian Senator and human rights activist
Musa Halilu Ahmed, Nigerian businessman and politician
Saudatu Sani

See also
 List of polytechnics in Nigeria

References

External links
 Official website

 
Universities and colleges in Kaduna State
1956 establishments in Nigeria
Educational institutions established in 1956
Polytechnics in Nigeria
Public universities in Nigeria